Saraswati River is a tributary of Alaknanda River flowing in Uttarakhand State, India. It joins Alaknanda River at Keshav Prayag, near Mana village, Badrinath. The confluence of 
rivers Alaknanda and Bhagirathi at Devprayag in the state of Uttarakhand, forms and flows as river Ganga or The Ganges from the point forward. 
A natural stone bridge, named "Bhim Pul", lays across flowing Saraswati river, making a passage towards Vasudhara falls and Satopanth Lake. It is believed by locals that Bhim Pul is a rock bridge founded by Bhima of Mahabharatha, to help Draupadi to cross the rivulet.

References

Rivers of Uttarakhand
Geography of Chamoli district
Rivers of India